Abdullah ibn Atik was a companion of Muhammad. He participated in the Expedition of 'Abdullah ibn 'Atik where he successfully assassinated Sallam ibn Abu al-Huqayq. Where he led a group of men from the Banu Khazraj tribe.

He was killed in the Battle of Yamama.

Abu Rafi's assassination at the hands of Abdullah ibn Atik is mentioned in many Sunni Hadith:

See also
List of expeditions of Muhammad

References

Companions of the Prophet
Year of birth unknown
Year of death unknown
Date of birth unknown
Date of death unknown
Place of birth unknown
Place of death unknown